Pedro Jaime Martínez (born October 25, 1971) is a Dominican-American former professional baseball starting pitcher, who played in Major League Baseball (MLB) from  to , for five teams—most notably the Boston Red Sox from  to .

Martínez ended his career with an earned run average (ERA) of 2.93, the sixth-lowest by a pitcher with at least 2,500 innings pitched, since 1920. He reached the 3,000 strikeout mark in fewer innings than any pitcher except Randy Johnson, and is the only pitcher to compile over 3,000 career strikeouts with fewer than 3,000 innings pitched; Martínez's career strikeout rate of 10.04 per nine innings trails only Johnson (10.61) among pitchers with over 1,500 innings.

He won three Cy Young Awards (1997, 1999, 2000) and was runner-up twice (1998, 2002), posting a cumulative record of 118–36 (.766) with a 2.20 ERA, while leading his league in ERA five times and in winning percentage and strikeouts three times each. In , Martínez was runner-up for the American League (AL) Most Valuable Player Award, after winning the pitching Triple Crown with a 23–4 record, 2.07 ERA, and 313 strikeouts, and—along with Johnson—joined Gaylord Perry in the rare feat of winning the Cy Young Award in both the American and National Leagues (a feat since accomplished by Roger Clemens, Roy Halladay, and Max Scherzer). He is also the record holder for the lowest single-season WHIP in major league history (0.737 in ), and is the record holder for the lowest single-season Fielding Independent Pitching (FIP) in the live ball era (1.39 in 1999). Although his performance suffered a steep decline in 2004, Martínez ended the season memorably, by helping the Red Sox end a long drought in winning their first World Series title in 86 years.

In his early 30s, injuries began to keep him off the field to an increasing extent, with his appearances and success dropping off sharply, in his final seasons. Modern sabermetric analysis has strongly highlighted Martínez's achievements; his WHIP is the lowest of any live-ball era starting pitcher, his adjusted ERA+ is the best of any starting pitcher in major league history, and he has the third-highest strikeout-to-walk ratio in modern history. He dominated while pitching most often in a hitter-friendly ballpark and facing some of the toughest competition during the steroid era, which is generally thought to have favored batters. His dominance, reflected by modern statistics, has led many to consider Martínez as one of the greatest pitchers in MLB history. He was elected to the Baseball Hall of Fame in 2015 in his first year of eligibility, joining Juan Marichal as the second Dominican to be enshrined; his number (45) was retired by the Red Sox in a ceremony, two days after his Hall induction.

Early life
Martínez grew up in the Dominican Republic in the Santo Domingo suburb of Manoguayabo. He was the fifth of six siblings living in a palm wood house with a tin roof and dirt floors. His father, Pablo Jaime Abreu, worked odd jobs. His mother, Leopoldina Martínez, worked for traditionally wealthy families, washing their clothes. When Pedro was old enough to work, he held a job as a mechanic.

He did not have enough money to afford baseballs, so he improvised with oranges. His older brother, Ramón Martínez, was pitching at a Los Angeles Dodgers baseball camp in the Dominican Republic. As a young teenager, Martínez carried his brother's bags at the camp. One day at the camp, Ramón Martínez clocked his 14-year-old brother's pitches at between 78 and 80 miles per hour.

Martínez debuted professionally with the Tigres del Licey of the Dominican Winter League during the 1989–90 season. He then pitched briefly for the Azucareros del Este, before rejoining Licey in 1991–92 in a nine-player transaction that included George Bell, José Offerman and Julio Solano, among others.

Career

Los Angeles Dodgers
Martínez was originally signed by the Dodgers as an amateur free agent in 1988. In his first season in the minors he was assigned to the Great Falls Dodgers where he worked with coach Guy Conti to develop a circle changeup which Conti had learned from Johnny Podres. Conti also worked with the young pitcher on his English and helped him assimilate to the United States; Martínez later described Conti as his "white daddy." As a minor leaguer in the Dodgers farm system, he was a highly touted prospect although some talent evaluators took issue with his "poise" despite his having a "great fastball and circle-changeup." He made his MLB debut on September 24, 1992, for the Dodgers against the Cincinnati Reds, working two scoreless innings of relief. He made his first start for the Dodgers on September 30, taking the loss while giving up two runs in a 3–1 loss to the Reds.

Although Pedro's brother Ramón, then a star pitcher for the Dodgers, declared that his brother was an even better pitcher than he, the younger Martínez was thought by manager Tommy Lasorda too small to be an effective starting pitcher at the MLB level; Lasorda used Pedro Martínez almost exclusively as a relief pitcher. Lasorda was not the first to question Martínez's stature and durability; in the minor leagues, the then-135-pound pitcher was threatened with a $500 fine if he was caught running. Martínez turned in a strong 1993 season as the Dodgers' setup man, going 10–5 with a 2.61 ERA and 119 strikeouts, in 65 games; his 107 innings led all NL relievers. With the Dodgers in need of a second baseman after a contract dispute with Jody Reed, Martínez was traded to the Montreal Expos for Delino DeShields before the 1994 season.

Montreal Expos
It was with the Expos that Martínez developed into one of the top pitchers in baseball. Despite possessing a live fastball, he had difficulty maintaining control. It was during a bullpen session that manager Felipe Alou encouraged him to modify his primary grip on the fastball from two-seam to four-seam. The transformation was dramatic: the fastball − already among the fastest in the game − now was thrown with near-impeccable control and break that routinely overwhelmed hitters. On April 13, 1994, Martínez took a perfect game through  innings until throwing a brushback pitch at Reggie Sanders that led Sanders to immediately charge the mound, starting a bench-clearing brawl. Martínez ended up with a no-decision in the game, which the Expos eventually won 3–2.

On June 3, 1995, Martínez pitched nine perfect innings in a game against the San Diego Padres, before giving up a hit in the bottom of the 10th inning. He was immediately removed from the game, and was the winning pitcher in Montreal's 1–0 victory. [See Memorable Games]

In 1996, during a game against the Philadelphia Phillies, Mike Williams attempted to hit Martínez with retaliatory pitches for an earlier hit batter but failed with two consecutive attempts. After the second attempt, Martínez charged the mound, and started a bench-clearing fight.

In 1997, Martínez posted a 17–8 record for the Expos, and led the league in half a dozen pitching categories, including a 1.90 ERA, 305 strikeouts and 13 complete games pitched, while becoming the only Expo ever to win the National League Cy Young Award. The 13 complete games were tied for the second-highest single-season total in the modern era of baseball since Martínez's career began (Curt Schilling had 15 in 1998; Chuck Finley and Jack McDowell also reached 13 in a year). However, this 1997 total is by far the highest in Martínez's career, as he only completed more than five games in one other season (seven, in 2000). Martínez was the first right-handed pitcher to reach 300 strikeouts with an ERA under 2.00 since Walter Johnson in 1912.

Boston Red Sox

Approaching free agency, Martínez was traded to the Boston Red Sox in November 1997 for Carl Pavano and Tony Armas Jr., and was soon signed to a six-year, $75 million contract (with an option for a seventh at $17 million) by Red Sox general manager Dan Duquette, at the time the largest ever awarded to a pitcher. Martínez paid immediate dividends in 1998, with a 19–7 record, and finishing second in the American League in ERA, WHIP, strikeouts, and the Cy Young voting.

In 1999, Martínez finished 23–4 with a 2.07 ERA and 313 strikeouts (earning the pitching Triple Crown) in 31 games (29 starts), pitching  innings. He led the entire major leagues with K/9 and K/BB ratios of 13.20 and 8.46 and his Fielding Independent Pitching (FIP) (a defense independent pitching statistic measuring a pitchers effectiveness to limit walks, homers and hits and accumulate strikeouts) of 1.39 was the lowest in modern major league history and the third lowest in history behind Christy Mathewson in 1908 and Walter Johnson in 1910 (by comparison the next best FIP in baseball was Randy Johnson's 2.76 and no one else in the American League had an FIP below 3.25). unanimously winning his second Cy Young Award (this time in the American League), and coming in second in the Most Valuable Player (MVP) ballot. The MVP result was controversial, as Martínez received the most first-place votes of any player (8 of 28), but was omitted from the ballot of two sportswriters, New York's George King and Minneapolis' LaVelle Neal. The two writers argued that pitchers were not sufficiently all-around players to be considered. (However, George King had given MVP votes to two pitchers just the season before: Rick Helling and David Wells; King was the only writer to cast a vote for Helling, who had gone 20–7 with a 4.41 ERA and 164 strikeouts.) MVP ballots have ten ranked slots, and sportswriters are traditionally asked to recuse themselves if they feel they cannot vote for a pitcher. "It really made us all look very dumb", said Buster Olney, then a sportswriter for The New York Times. "People were operating under different rules. The question of eligibility is a very basic thing. People were determining eligibility for themselves." The Times does not permit its writers to participate in award voting. Martínez finished second to Texas Rangers catcher Iván Rodríguez, by a margin of 252 points to 239. Rodríguez had been included on all 28 ballots. When asked about the result by WEEI-FM radio in January 2012, Martínez said, "I'm not afraid to say that the way that George King and Mr. LaVelle Neal III went about it was unprofessional."

In 1999, Martínez became just the 9th modern pitcher to have a second 300-strikeout season, along with Nolan Ryan (6 times), Randy Johnson (third time in 1999, and three more times since), Sandy Koufax (3 times), Rube Waddell, Walter Johnson, Sam McDowell, J. R. Richard, Steve Carlton, and Curt Schilling; Schilling would later add a third 300-K season. An anomaly in power pitching annals, Martínez is the only 20th-century pitcher to notch 300 strikeouts in a season without being at least six feet tall. He was not afraid to pitch inside. On May 1, 1999, against Oakland, he came inside to Olmedo Saenz, hitting him. Previously, Saenez had hit a three-run homer off him. Questioned after the game he said ``I have no reason to hit [Saenz], But believe me ... if you get fresh with me or do something to show me up, I'll drill your ass.Between August 1999 and April 2000, Martínez had ten consecutive starts with 10 or more strikeouts. Only three pitchers have had as many as seven such starts in a row, and one of those was Martínez himself, in April–May 1999. He averaged more than 15 strikeouts per nine innings during his record 10-game streak. During the 1999 season, he set the record for most consecutive innings pitched with a strikeout, with 40. For his career, Martínez has compiled 15 or more strikeouts in a game ten times, which is tied with Roger Clemens for the third-most 15-K games in history. (Nolan Ryan had 27, and Randy Johnson had 29.)

Martínez was named the AL Pitcher of the Month in April, May, June and September 1999—four times in a single season. Martínez punctuated his dominance in the 1999 All-Star Game start at Fenway Park, when he struck out Barry Larkin, Larry Walker, Sammy Sosa, Mark McGwire and Jeff Bagwell in two innings. It was the first time any pitcher struck out the side to start an All-Star Game, and the performance earned Martínez the All-Star Game MVP award. Martínez later said that the 1999 All-Star break was especially memorable for him because he was able to meet the members of the MLB All-Century Team and get an autograph from Ted Williams.

Martínez was a focal point of the 1999 playoffs against the Cleveland Indians. Starting the series opener, he was forced out of the game after four shutout innings due to a strained back with the Red Sox up 2–0. The Red Sox, however, lost the game 3–2. Boston won the next two games to tie the series, but Martínez was still too injured to start the fifth and final game. However, neither team's starters were effective, and the game became a slugfest, tied at 8–8 at the end of three innings. Martínez entered the game as an emergency relief option. Unexpectedly, Martínez neutralized the Cleveland lineup with six no-hit innings for the win. He struck out eight and walked three, despite not being able to throw either his fastball or changeup with any command. Relying totally on his curve, Martínez and the Red Sox won the deciding game 12–8.

In the American League Championship Series, Martínez pitched seven shutout innings to beat Red Sox nemesis Roger Clemens and the New York Yankees in Game 3, handing the World Champions their only loss of the 1999 postseason.

Following up 1999, Martínez had perhaps his best year in 2000. Martínez posted an exceptional 1.74 ERA, the AL's lowest since 1978, while winning his third Cy Young Award. His ERA was about a third of the park-adjusted league ERA (4.97). No other single season by a starting pitcher has had such a large differential. Roger Clemens' 3.70 was the second-lowest ERA in the AL, but was still more than double that of Martínez. Martínez also set a record in the lesser-known sabermetric statistic of Weighted Runs allowed per nine innings pitched (Wtd. RA/9), posting a remarkably low 1.55 Wtd. RA/9. He gave up only 128 hits in 217 innings, for an average of just 5.31 hits allowed per nine innings pitched: the third-lowest mark on record.

Martínez's record was 18–6, but the six losses were largely tough luck. In his six losses, Martínez had 60 strikeouts, eight walks, and 30 hits allowed in 48 innings, with a 2.44 ERA and an 0.79 WHIP, while averaging eight innings per start. Martínez's ERA in his losing games was less than the leading ERA total in the lower-scoring National League (Kevin Brown's 2.58). The Yankees' Andy Pettitte outdueled Martínez twice; Martínez's other four losses were each by one run. Martínez's first loss of the year was a 1–0 complete game in which he had 17 strikeouts and one walk. All of Martínez's losses were quality starts, and he pitched eight or more innings in all but one of his losses. Martínez received two runs or fewer of run support in 10 of his starts (over one-third of his starts), in which his ERA was a minuscule 1.25 with 4 complete games and 2 shutouts, but his win–loss record was 4–5.

Martínez's WHIP in 2000 was 0.74, breaking both the 87-year-old modern Major League record set by Walter Johnson, as well as Guy Hecker's mark of 0.77 in 1882. The American League slugged just .259 against him. Hitters also had a .167 batting average and .213 on-base percentage, setting two more modern era records. In the 2000 season, Martínez became the first starting pitcher in MLB history to have more than twice as many strikeouts in a season (284) as hits allowed (128) (later, also accomplished by Randy Johnson in 2001 with 372 strikeouts and 181 hits as well as Max Scherzer in 2017, and both Gerrit Cole and Justin Verlander in 2019). Martínez also set an American League record in K/BB, with a ratio of 8.88, surpassing the previous record set by Martínez in 1999 of 8.46.

When opposing teams had runners in scoring position, however, Martínez was even stingier. There were 138 such plate appearances against Martínez in 2000, in which opponents batted .133 with a .188 on-base percentage. Martínez struck out 58 while walking six, and allowed 17 hits.

On May 6 of that 2000 season, Martínez struck out 17 Tampa Bay Devil Rays in a 1–0 loss. In his next start six days later, he struck out 15 Baltimore Orioles in a 9–0, two-hit victory. The 32 strikeouts tied Luis Tiant's 32-year American League record for most strikeouts over two games.

In the span of 1999 and 2000, Martínez allowed 288 hits and 69 walks in 430 innings, with 597 strikeouts, an 0.83 WHIP, and a 1.90 ERA. Some statisticians believe that in the circumstances—with lefty-friendly Fenway Park as his home field, in a league with a designated hitter, during the peak era of steroid usage in the MLB—this performance represents the peak for any pitcher in baseball history.

Though he continued his dominance when healthy, carrying a sub-2.00 ERA to the midpoint of the following season, Martínez spent much of 2001 on the disabled list with a rotator cuff injury as the Red Sox slumped to a poor finish. Martínez finished with a 7–3 record, a 2.39 ERA, and 163 strikeouts, but only threw 116 innings.

Healthy in 2002, he rebounded to lead the league with a 2.26 ERA, 0.923 WHIP and 239 strikeouts, while going 20–4. However, that season's American League Cy Young Award narrowly went to 23-game winner Barry Zito of the Oakland A's, despite Zito's higher ERA, higher WHIP, fewer strikeouts, and lower winning percentage. Martínez became the first pitcher since the introduction of the Cy Young Award to lead his league in each of those four statistics, yet not win the award.

Martínez's record was 14–4 in 2003. He led the league in ERA for the fifth time with 2.22, also led in WHIP for the fifth time at 1.04, and finished second to league leader Esteban Loaiza by a single strikeout. Martínez came in third for the 2003 Cy Young Award, which went to Toronto's Roy Halladay.

Martínez went 16–9 in 2004, despite an uncharacteristic 3.90 ERA, as the Red Sox won the American League wild-card berth. He pitched effectively in the playoffs, contributing to the team's first World Series win in 86 years. He earned the win in game 2 of the ALDS against Anaheim, in the ALCS he recorded his only loss of the postseason as well as a no-decision. In game 3 of the World Series he carried a shutout into the 8th inning and retired the last fourteen batters he faced. Martínez again finished second in AL strikeouts, and was fourth in that winter's Cy Young voting.

The seven-year contract he received from the Red Sox had been considered a huge risk in the 1997 off-season, but Martínez had rewarded the team's hopes with two Cy Young Awards, and six Top-4 finishes. Martínez finished his Red Sox career with a 117–37 record, the highest winning percentage any pitcher has had with any team in baseball history.

New York Mets

After Boston's World Series triumph in 2004, Martínez became a free agent and signed a four-year, $53 million contract with the New York Mets. In 2005, his first season as a Met, Martínez posted a 15–8 record with a 2.82 ERA, 208 strikeouts, and a league-leading 0.95 WHIP. It was his sixth league WHIP title, and the fifth time that he led the Major Leagues in the category. Opponents batted .204 against him.

Martínez started the 2006 season at the top of his game. At the end of May, he was 5–1 with a 2.50 ERA, with 88 strikeouts and 17 walks and 44 hits allowed in 76 innings; Martínez's record was worse than it could have been, with the Mets bullpen costing him two victories. However, during his May 26 start against the Florida Marlins, Martínez was instructed by the umpires to change his undershirt. He slipped in the corridor, injuring his hip, and his promising season curdled. The effect was not immediately apparent; although Martínez lost the Marlins game, his following start was a scintillating 0–0 duel with Arizona's Brandon Webb. But after that, beginning on June 6, Martínez went 4–7 with a 7.10 ERA in a series of spotty starts interrupted twice by stays on the disabled list. A right calf injury plagued him for the last two months of the season. After Martínez was removed from an ineffective September 15 outing, television cameras found him in the Mets dugout, apparently crying. Subsequent MRI exams revealed a torn muscle in Martínez's left calf, and a torn rotator cuff. Martínez underwent surgery which sidelined him for most of the 2007 season.

On November 3, 2006, Martínez stated that if he could not return to full strength, he might end up retiring after the 2007 season. "It's getting better, and progress is above all what is hoped for", Martínez told the Associated Press. "To go back, I have to recover, I have to be healthy. But if God doesn't want that, then I would have to think about giving it all up." Martínez added, "It's going to be a bitter winter because I am going to have to do a lot of work. The pain I feel was one of the worst I have felt with any injury in my career." But by December 30, 2006, Martínez was more optimistic: "The progress has been excellent. I don't have problems anymore with my reach or flexibility, and so far everything is going very well. The problem has to do with the calcification of the bone that was broken with the tear, and that had to be operated on. You have to let it run its course." Martínez also reported bulking up as part of his recuperative regimen: "I've put on about 10 pounds of muscle, because that's one of our strategies."

On September 3, 2007, Martínez returned from the disabled list with his 207th career win, allowing two earned runs in five efficient innings and collecting his 3000th career strikeout, becoming the 15th pitcher to do so. "I thought I was going to have butterflies and like that", said Martínez, "but I guess I'm too old." Martínez's comeback was considered a great success, as the right-hander went 3–1 in five starts with a 2.57 ERA. But his last start was a crucial 3–0 loss to St. Louis in the final week of the 2007 Mets' historic collapse; Martínez provided a good pitching performance (7 IP, 2 ER, 7 H, 1 BB, 8 K) but his teammates failed to score.

Martínez became just the fourth pitcher to reach 3,000 strikeouts with fewer than 1,000 walks (in Martínez's case, 701). Ferguson Jenkins, Greg Maddux and Curt Schilling had previously done likewise. Martínez also joined Nolan Ryan and Randy Johnson to become the third 3,000-strikeout pitcher to have more strikeouts than innings pitched, and is also the first Latin American pitcher to have 3,000 strikeouts.

His unexpectedly strong finish in 2007 raised hopes, but 2008 was a lost season for Martínez. He was injured just four innings into his first game of the season, an April 1 no-decision against the Florida Marlins. He later told reporters he'd felt a "pop" in his left leg. Martínez was diagnosed with a strained hamstring and did not return to action for more than two months. Following his return, his fastball typically topped out in the 90–91 mph range, a lower velocity than he'd had during his prime but slightly higher than in recent seasons. Martínez finished the season on a low note, losing all three of his decisions in September en route to a 5–6 record, the first losing record of his career. (Martínez was 0–1 in two appearances in 1992.) His 5.61 ERA and 1.57 WHIP were also Martínez's worst ever, and for the first time in his career, he failed to strike out at least twice as many batters as he walked (87–44).

During his four-year Met contract, Martínez was 32–23 in 79 starts, with a 3.88 ERA and a 1.16 WHIP.

Philadelphia Phillies

A free agent, Martínez did not sign with a major league team during the winter. In March, he joined the Dominican Republic's squad for the 2009 World Baseball Classic, in an attempt to showcase his arm. Martínez pitched six scoreless innings with 6 strikeouts and no walks, but the team was quickly eliminated from the tournament and no MLB contract was forthcoming. In July 2009, Phillies scouts evaluated Martínez in two simulated games against the Phillies DSL team, leading to a one-year, $1-million contract. Martínez told reporters, "I would just like to be the backup. If I could be the backup, that would be a great thing to have—a healthy Pedro behind everybody else, in case something happens. That would be a great feeling to have on a team, eh?"

Replacing Jamie Moyer as a starter in the Phillies rotation on August 12, Martínez won his 2009 debut. In his return to New York on August 23, Martínez's win against the Mets was preserved by a rare unassisted triple play by second baseman Eric Bruntlett in the bottom of the ninth inning. With his win on September 3—his third as a Philadelphia Phillie and his 100th as a National Leaguer—Martínez became the 10th pitcher in history to win at least 100 games in each league. On September 13, Martínez pitched eight innings to beat the Mets again, by a final score of 1–0. His 130 pitches were the most he had thrown in a game since the ALDS in October 2003. Philadelphia won each of Martínez's first seven starts, the first time in franchise history that this had occurred with any debuting Phillies pitcher. In the NLCS against the Los Angeles Dodgers, he pitched seven shutout innings while allowing just two hits, but the Philadelphia bullpen faltered in the following inning, costing Martínez the win.

Intense media interest preceded Martínez's "return to Yankee Stadium" in Game 2 of the World Series. At the pre-game press conference, he seemed to relish the attention, telling reporters, "When you have 60,000 people chanting your name, waiting for you to throw the ball, you have to consider yourself someone special, someone that really has a purpose out there." Martínez pitched effectively in his second-ever World Series start, but left the game in the 7th inning trailing, 2–1, and wound up taking the loss. Before his second start of the Series, Martínez called himself and opposing pitcher Andy Pettitte "old goats", and acknowledged that Red Sox fans were rooting for him: "I know that they don't like the Yankees to win, not even in Nintendo games." However, Martínez allowed four runs in four innings, falling to 0–2 as the Phillies lost the sixth game and the 2009 World Series to the New York Yankees.

Following the Series, Martínez announced that he had no intention of retiring, but the 2010 season came and went without his signing with a team. Media reports surfaced that the Phillies had been discussing a deal to bring Martínez back for another half-season, but Martínez's agent announced in July that he would not be pitching at all in 2010, while remaining interested in a 2011 return. In December 2010, Martínez told a reporter for El Día "I'm realizing what it is to be a normal person. ... It's most likely that I don't return to active baseball ... but honestly I don't know if I'll definitively announce my retirement." The pitcher received some initial inquiries during the winter, but did not sign with any team for 2011. On December 4, 2011, he officially announced his retirement.

In December 2009, Sports Illustrated named Martínez as one of the five pitchers in the starting rotation of its MLB All-Decade Team. In February 2011, the Smithsonian's National Portrait Gallery announced that it had acquired an oil painting of Martínez for its collection.

After retirement

On January 24, 2013, Martínez joined the Boston Red Sox as a special assistant to general manager Ben Cherington.

Martínez was elected to the National Baseball Hall of Fame in January 2015 with 91.1% of the vote. His Hall of Fame plaque has him wearing a Boston Red Sox cap. "I cannot be any prouder to take Red Sox Nation to the Hall of Fame with the logo on my plaque", Martínez said in a statement. "I am extremely proud to represent Boston and all of New England with my Hall of Fame career. I'm grateful to all of the teams for which I played, and especially fans, for making this amazing honor come true."

In 2015, Martínez was hired by the MLB Network as a studio analyst and also released an autobiography, Pedro, which he co-authored with Michael Silverman of the Boston Herald. Reflecting on his career, he named Barry Bonds, Edgar Martínez, Derek Jeter, Kenny Lofton and Ichiro Suzuki as the most difficult hitters he had to face. All-Stars Sandy Alomar Jr., Moisés Alou, Carlos Beltrán, David Ortiz, Dean Palmer, Alex Rodriguez and Alfonso Soriano have named Martínez as the toughest pitcher they ever had to face.

On June 22, 2015, it was announced that Martínez's number 45 would be retired by the Red Sox on July 28, two days after his Hall of Fame induction. Red Sox principal owner John Henry stated, "to be elected into the Baseball Hall of Fame upon his first year of eligibility speaks volumes regarding Pedro's outstanding career, and is a testament to the respect and admiration so many in baseball have for him."

On February 1, 2018, Martínez was announced as part of the 2018 induction class for the Canadian Baseball Hall of Fame.

In addition to MLB Network, Martínez works as an MLB on TBS studio analyst for Postseason coverage.

Memorable games

Imperfect hit-by-pitch
On April 13, 1994, in his second start as a Montreal Expo, Martínez lost a perfect game with one out in the eighth inning when he hit Cincinnati's Reggie Sanders with a pitch. An angered Sanders charged the mound, and threw Martínez to the ground, before both teams cleared the benches and broke up any potential fight. Sanders was later ridiculed in the press for assuming that a pitcher would abandon a perfect game in order to hit a batter intentionally. Martínez allowed a leadoff single in the ninth inning, breaking up his no-hitter, and was removed for reliever John Wetteland (who loaded the bases, then allowed two sacrifice flies, thus saddling Martínez with a no-decision). Three years later, in 1997, Martínez had a one-hitter against the Reds; the one hit came in the 5th inning.

Nine perfect innings
On June 3, 1995, while pitching for Montreal, he retired the first 27 Padres hitters he faced. However, the score was still tied 0–0 at that point and the game went into extra innings. The Expos scored a run in the top of the 10th, but Martínez surrendered a double to the 28th batter he faced, Bip Roberts. Expos manager Felipe Alou then removed Martínez from the game, bringing in reliever Mel Rojas, who retired the next three batters. Martínez officially recorded neither a perfect game nor a no-hitter. Until 1991, the rules would have judged it differently; however, a rule clarification specified that perfect games, even beyond nine innings, must remain perfect until the game is completed for them to be considered perfect. This retroactively decertified many no-hit games, including Ernie Shore's perfect relief stint in 1917 and Harvey Haddix's legendary 12 perfect innings in 1959 (lost in the 13th).

All-Star strikeout streak
Martínez was selected as the starting pitcher for the American League All-Star team in 1999. The game, on July 13, 1999, was at Fenway Park, Martínez's home field. Martínez struck out Barry Larkin, Larry Walker, and Sammy Sosa consecutively in the first inning. He then struck out Mark McGwire leading off the 2nd, becoming the first pitcher to begin an All-Star game by striking out the first four batters. (The National League's Brad Penny matched the feat in 2006.) The next batter, Matt Williams, managed to reach first base from an error by Roberto Alomar. Martínez then proceeded to strike out Jeff Bagwell while Williams was caught stealing.

Yankee Stadium one-hitter
Martínez again came close to a perfect game on September 10, 1999, when he beat the New York Yankees, 3–1. He faced just 28 batters while striking out 17 and walking none (Martínez hit the Yankees' first batter, Chuck Knoblauch, but he was then caught stealing). Only a solo home run by Chili Davis separated Martínez from a no-hitter. The Davis home run came in the second inning, eliminating any suspense, but sportswriter Thomas Boswell called it the best game ever pitched at Yankee Stadium. Martínez not only retired the last 22 batters in a row, but over the last  innings, (11 batters), Martínez threw 53 consecutive pitches without allowing a base runner, and without a single ball being put in play. (Nine strikeouts, two foul-ball fly outs.) The Yankees managed only ONE fair ball out of his last 70 pitches. One single fair ball….after the fourth inning.

Hitless clincher
On October 11, 1999, in Game 5 of the ALDS, Charles Nagy started for Cleveland and Bret Saberhagen started for Boston, both on only three days rest. Boston jumped out to a quick two-run lead in the top of the first inning, but Cleveland responded with three runs of their own in the bottom half of the inning. The hitting continued, knocking Saberhagen out of the game in the second inning having allowed five runs, and then Nagy out of the game after only finishing only three innings and allowing eight runs. Going into the fourth inning, manager Jimy Williams opted to replace Derek Lowe with the ailing Pedro Martínez, who had left Game 1 with a back injury. This decision would prove to be wise, as Martínez threw six hitless innings in relief to win and clinch the ALDS.

1999 ALCS
Game 3 of the American League Championship Series was the long-anticipated matchup between Pedro Martínez and Roger Clemens. The Red Sox scored first. After a leadoff triple by Offerman, Valentin homered to put the Red Sox ahead 2–0. The onslaught continued as the Red Sox scored in all but two innings. Clemens was done in the third inning and the Red Sox would go on to win 13–1 and make the series two games to one. When Clemens was knocked out, Red Sox fans chanted "Where is Roger?" and then a response chant of "In the Shower". Martínez struck out 12 Yankees in seven scoreless innings and allowing just two hits, to beat Red Sox nemesis Roger Clemens and the New York Yankees in Game 3, handing the World Champions their only loss of the 1999 postseason. Martínez finished 1999 with a streak of 17 scoreless innings in the playoffs.

Faceoff vs. Roger Clemens on ESPN
On May 28, 2000, Martínez and Roger Clemens had a dramatic duel on ESPN's "Sunday Night Baseball" telecast. Both pitchers excelled, combining to allow only nine hits and one walk while striking out 22. A scoreless game was finally broken up in the 9th inning by Trot Nixon's home run off Clemens. In the bottom of the ninth, the Yankees loaded the bases against a tiring Martínez, but New York could not score, as Martínez completed the shutout.

Another close call
On August 29, 2000, Martínez took a no-hitter into the 9th against the Tampa Bay Devil Rays, losing it on a leadoff single by John Flaherty. Martínez had begun the night by hitting the leadoff batter, Gerald Williams, in the hand. Williams started towards first base before charging the mound and knocking down Martínez; in the scrum, Williams was tackled by Boston catcher Jason Varitek. Martínez then retired the next 24 hitters in a row until allowing Flaherty's single, and finished with a one-hitter. He had 13 strikeouts and no walks in the game; the Flaherty single would have broken up a perfect game, if not for the leadoff hit batsman. Martínez never threw an official no-hitter. However, he has professed a lack of interest in the matter: "I think my career is more interesting than one game."

Martínez vs. Zimmer
In the testy Game 3 of the 2003 ALCS, after allowing single runs in the 2nd, 3rd, and 4th innings, Martínez hit Yankees right fielder Karim García near the shoulders with a pitch, sparking a shouting match between Martínez and the New York bench. Directing his attention at Yankees catcher Jorge Posada, Martínez jabbed a finger into the side of his own head, which some, including an enraged Yankee bench coach Don Zimmer, interpreted as a threatened beanball. Emotions remained high in the bottom of the inning, which was led off by Boston slugger Manny Ramírez. Ramírez became irate over a high pitch from Roger Clemens, and both benches cleared. During the ensuing commotion, the 72-year-old Zimmer ran onto the field and started straight for Martínez; as he approached Martínez threw Zimmer to the ground. Later, Martínez claimed that he was not indicating that he would hit Posada in the head, but that he would remember what Posada was saying to him. In 2009, Martínez stated that he regretted the incident but denied being at fault. Zimmer did not give much credence to Pedro's statements. Martínez wrote in 2015 that the altercation with Zimmer was his only regret in his entire career.

Grady Little's visit
Martínez was also on the mound for Game 7 of the 2003 ALCS versus the Yankees. With the Red Sox ahead 5–2 at the start of the 8th inning, a tiring Martínez pitched his way into trouble. He was visited on the mound by manager Grady Little, but was left in to pitch, in a controversial non-move. The Yankees tied the score against Martínez in that inning on four successive hits, leading to a dramatic extra-inning, series-ending victory for New York, costing Grady Little his job with the Red Sox as his contract was not renewed.

World Series debut
After a comparatively lackluster season in 2004 (though still a solid season by general standards), Pedro Martínez got the win in Game 3 of the World Series. He shut out the St. Louis Cardinals through seven innings, recording his final 14 outs consecutively in what would turn out to be his last game for Boston.

Mets
With the Mets, on April 10, 2005, at Turner Field, Martínez outdueled John Smoltz, pitching a two-hit, one-run, complete game en route to his first Mets victory. On August 14, 2005, against the Dodgers, he pitched  hitless innings, but ended up losing the no-hitter and the game.

Return to Fenway
In June 2006, the Mets played an interleague series against the Red Sox, which was Martínez's first appearance at Fenway Park since leaving the team. The Red Sox gave their former ace a two-minute video tribute on June 27, but showed no courtesies to Martínez the following night. In his June 28, 2006 start, Martínez lasted only three innings, and was rocked for eight runs (six earned) on seven hits, losing his worst game as a Met just before going onto the disabled list. It was Martínez's only career appearance against the Red Sox, the only Major League team against which he did not record a victory.

Who's Your Daddy?
In both the 2004 ALCS and the 2009 World Series, Martínez was greeted with the chant "Who's your daddy?" from New York Yankees fans whenever Pedro was pitching due to his statement earlier in the 2004 ALCS saying, "I mean what can I say? Just tip my hat and call the Yankees my daddies."

Quotes

Pitching style
Martínez threw five pitches. His four-seam fastball, power curveball, cutter, sinker, and circle changeup were all well above average; combined with his historically excellent control, they proved to be an overpowering package. Martínez threw from a low three-quarters position (nearly sidearm) that hid the ball very well from batters, who have remarked on the difficulty of picking up Martínez's delivery. Additionally, Martínez threw three different types of fastballs - a straight high-velocity four-seam fastball he used to overpower hitters, a two-seamer that ran to his throwing arm side, and a cut fastball that ran away from his throwing arm side - each with the pinpoint control that defined him.

Early in his career, Martínez's fastball was consistently clocked in the 95–98 mph range. Using it in combination with his devastating changeup and occasionally mixing in his curveball, he was as dominant a pitcher as the game has ever seen. Sports Illustrated''s Joe Posnanski wrote, "There has never been a pitcher in baseball history—not Walter Johnson, not Lefty Grove, not Sandy Koufax, not Tom Seaver, not Roger Clemens—who was more overwhelming than the young Pedro."

As injuries and the aging process took their toll, Martínez made the adjustment to rely more on finesse than power. His fastball settled into the 85–88 mph range, although he was occasionally able to reach 90–91 mph when the need arose. Martínez continued to use a curveball, a circle changeup, and an occasional slider. With his command of the strike zone, he remained an effective strikeout pitcher despite the drop in velocity. Baseball historian Bill James described Martínez as being substantially more effective than his pitching peers due to his variety of pitches, pitch speeds, pinpoint control, and numerous modes of deception.

Personal life
Pedro is married to former ESPN Deportes sideline reporter Carolina Cruz de Martínez, who now runs his charitable organization, Pedro Martínez and Brothers Foundation. He has four children. One of his sons, Pedro Martínez Jr., signed with the Detroit Tigers as an international free agent in September 2017. Another son, Pedro Isaías Martínez, signed at Nova Southeastern University in Fort Lauderdale, Florida. He also has another son, Enyol Martínez, and a daughter, Nayla Martínez.  Martínez has been a naturalized American citizen since 2006.

See also

 3,000 strikeout club
 List of Boston Red Sox Opening Day starting pitchers
 List of Major League Baseball annual ERA leaders
 List of Major League Baseball annual strikeout leaders
 List of Major League Baseball annual wins leaders
 List of Major League Baseball career hit batsmen leaders
 List of Major League Baseball career strikeout leaders
 List of Major League Baseball career wins leaders
 List of Major League Baseball pitchers who have thrown an immaculate inning
 List of New York Mets Opening Day starting pitchers
 Major League Baseball titles leaders

Explanatory notes

References

External links

 

 Pedro Martínez at SABR (Baseball BioProject)

 
 

 
 

 
 

 

1971 births
Living people
Albuquerque Dukes players
American League All-Stars
American League ERA champions
American League Pitching Triple Crown winners
American League strikeout champions
American League wins champions
Azucareros del Este players
Bakersfield Dodgers players
Boston Red Sox players
Canadian Baseball Hall of Fame inductees
Clearwater Threshers players
Cy Young Award winners
Dominican Republic expatriate baseball players in Canada
Dominican Republic expatriate baseball players in the United States
Great Falls Dodgers players
Gulf Coast Mets players

Lehigh Valley IronPigs players
Los Angeles Dodgers players
Major League Baseball All-Star Game MVPs
Major League Baseball pitchers
Major League Baseball players from the Dominican Republic
Major League Baseball players with retired numbers
MLB Network personalities
Montreal Expos players
National Baseball Hall of Fame inductees
National League All-Stars
National League ERA champions
New York Mets players
Ohio Dominican University alumni
People from Santo Domingo Province
Philadelphia Phillies players
Reading Phillies players
San Antonio Missions players
Sportspeople from Greenwich, Connecticut
St. Lucie Mets players
Tigres del Licey players
World Baseball Classic players of the Dominican Republic
2009 World Baseball Classic players